Levi Beardsley (November 13, 1785 – March 19, 1857) was an American lawyer and politician from New York.

Life
He was the son of Obadiah Beardsley (1763–1841) and Eunice (Moore) Beardsley (1765–1811). He was born on the Beardsley's farm where most of the Battle of Bennington was fought in August 1777. At the time of Beardsley's birth, the area belonged to the District of Hoosick in Albany County, and since 1791 has been in the Town of Hoosick in Rensselaer County.

In 1790, the family removed to a farm in an area which became part of the Town of Richfield, Otsego County, in 1792.

In 1810, he removed to Cherry Valley and studied law there with Jabez D. Hammond. Beardsley was admitted to the bar in 1812, and practiced in partnership with Hammond until 1822. On July 4, 1813, Beardsley married Elizabeth Raymond (1790–1864), and they had several children.

He was a member of the New York State Assembly (Otsego Co.) in 1826.

He was a member of the New York State Senate (6th D.) from 1830 to 1833, and from 1835 to 1838, sitting in the 53rd, 54th, 55th, 56th, 58th, 59th, 60th and 61st New York State Legislatures.

In 1839, he removed to Oswego and became President of the Commercial Bank there, but the bank—in the wake of the Panic of 1837—went bankrupt and was liquidated in 1841.

In 1842, he removed to Columbus, Ohio, and pursued agricultural interests there. After a big fire destroyed his farm, he sold the lands and removed to New York City in 1846. There he resumed the practice of law, and ran in 1847 for the New York Supreme Court, but was defeated.

In 1852, he published his Reminiscences (on-line version; 575 pg.).

He died in Oswego and was buried at the Riverside Cemetery in Scriba, New York.

Chief Justice Samuel Beardsley (1790–1860) was his brother, and Clergyman John Beardsley (1732–1809) was his great-uncle.

Sources
The New York Civil List compiled by Franklin Benjamin Hough (pages 128ff, 138, 204, 258; Weed, Parsons and Co., 1858)
Tombstone transcriptions from Riverside Cemetery at RootsWeb

1785 births
1857 deaths
People from Hoosick, New York
People from Cherry Valley, New York
Politicians from Columbus, Ohio
Members of the New York State Assembly
New York (state) state senators
New York (state) Democratic-Republicans
New York (state) Jacksonians
19th-century American politicians
People from Richfield, New York
Politicians from Oswego, New York
Lawyers from Columbus, Ohio